is a Japanese four-panel comic strip manga series written and illustrated by Kagari Tamaoka. It was serialized in Earth Star Entertainment's Comic Earth Star magazine between the April 2011 and July 2013 issues. An anime television series adaptation by Doga Kobo aired between January and March 2013 in Japan.

Media

Manga
Originally titled , Mangirl! is a four-panel comic strip manga written and illustrated by Kagari Tamaoka, with original character designs by Yasu. It was serialized in Earth Star Entertainment's Comic Earth Star magazine between the April 2011 and July 2013 issues. Three tankōbon volumes were released between May 12, 2012 and March 12, 2013.

Internet radio show
An Internet radio show to promote the manga titled  aired 18 episodes between August 16 and December 13, 2010. An additional special episode was broadcast on March 11, 2011. It was hosted by Mai Nakahara, Kana Ueda, Saori Hayami and Sayuri Yahagi. The show was streamed online every Monday, and was produced by the Japanese Internet radio station Hibiki.

Anime
An anime television series adaptation animated by Doga Kobo aired between January 2 and March 27, 2013 in Japan on Tokyo MX, Sun TV, ATX and Niconico. The anime was simulcast by Crunchyroll. An additional unaired 14th episode came bundled with the Blu-ray Disc release of the series on May 24, 2013.

Episode list

References

External links
 Official website 
 

2011 manga
2013 anime television series debuts
Anime series based on manga
Comedy anime and manga
Doga Kobo
Earth Star Entertainment manga
Manga creation in anime and manga
Shōnen manga
Tokyo MX original programming
Yonkoma